Keith Weller Horne (born 9 June 1971) is a professional golfer from South Africa.

Horne was born in Durban and had a successful amateur career. In 1993, Horne won a Silver Medal at the World Games in Spain. He turned professional in 1996. He is an alumnus of Westville Boys' High School.

Professional career
After turning professional in 1996, Horne immediately joined the local Sunshine Tour, the richest professional golf tour in South Africa. His first professional win came in 1998 at the Vodacom Series: Kwazulu Natal. After that, he had a few off-seasons until he won a few unofficial Pro-Ams in 2003. His second official win came in 2007 at the MTC Namibia PGA Championship. He won again a year later at the Nashua Golf Challenge. Horne also holds membership on the Asian Tour, where he has yet to win.

In 2010, a runner-up finish in the Joburg Open, and a top-10 finish at the Singapore Open, both events which are co-sanctioned with the European Tour meant that Horne earned enough to have a full European Tour membership for 2011.

In 2012, he picked up his fifth victory on the Sunshine Tour at the Telkom PGA Championship. He picked up two more wins in 2014, one in 2015 and another in 2017.

Personal life
Horne married his wife Karen in September 2000. He has two children, born in 2002 and 2007. He currently resides in Alberton.

Amateur highlights
1993–95 Represented Natal
1993 Won Silver Medal at World Games in Spain

Professional wins (12)

Sunshine Tour wins (9)

Sunshine Tour playoff record (1–2)

Other wins (3)
2003 Wild Coast Sun Touring Pro-Am, Royal Swazi Sun Touring Pro-Am
2009 Klipdrift Gold Sun International Touring Pro-Am

Results in World Golf Championships

"T" = Tied

See also
List of African golfers

External links

South African male golfers
Sunshine Tour golfers
Asian Tour golfers
European Tour golfers
Sportspeople from Durban
People from Alberton, Gauteng
White South African people
1971 births
Living people